Mikhail Romanovich "Mischa" Bakaleinikov (also spelled Bakaleynikov and Bakaleinikoff; ; November 10, 1890 – August 10, 1960) was a noted musical director, film composer and conductor.

Personal life
Brother to Constantin, Nikolay and Vladimir, Bakaleinikoff was born in Moscow in 1890. He left the Soviet Union for the United States, travelling via Shanghai, China, to Los Angeles, in 1926, and joined Columbia Studios's music department in Hollywood in 1931.

Death
Bakaleinikoff was a member of a Masonic Lodge. At his funeral service in 1960, the music was played by a string ensemble from Columbia. He died at age 69, and was survived by his wife, Yvonne (née Wilson) and their four children. He was previously married to actress Helen Gilbert.

He is buried at Forest Lawn Memorial Park (Glendale).

Career
Bakaleinikoff played the double bass viol in Columbia Studios' orchestra for films such as Lost Horizon before becoming the studio's music director in the early 1940s.

Selected filmography
He scored the music to the following films:
Ladies of Leisure (1930)
 Forbidden Trail (1932)
Jane Eyre (1934)
Behind the Green Lights (1935)
Blondie (1938)
The Pinto Kid (1941)
Underground Agent (1942)
Sergeant Mike (1944)
The Girl of the Limberlost (1945)
 Terror Trail (1946)
Galloping Thunder (1946)
The Son of Rusty (1947)
 Sport of Kings (1947)
 The Last Round-up (1947)
The Woman from Tangier (1948)
The Strawberry Roan (1948)
My Dog Rusty (1948)
Rusty Leads the Way (1948)
 Thunderhoof (1948)
Kazan (1949)
The Blazing Sun (1950)
The Kid from Amarillo (1951)
Pecos River (1951)
The Old West (1952)
Laramie Mountains (1952)
Flame of Calcutta (1953)
The 49th Man (1953)
Gun Fury (1953)
Cell 2455, Death Row (1955)
It Came from Beneath the Sea (1955)
Seminole Uprising (1955)
Earth vs. the Flying Saucers (1956)
 Reprisal! (1956)
Hellcats of the Navy (1957)
The Giant Claw (1957)
20 Million Miles to Earth (1957)
The 27th Day (1957)
Screaming Mimi (1958)
Have Rocket, Will Travel (1959)

References

External links
 
 All Movie Profile
 List of Movies at Cinefania
 

1890 births
1960 deaths
Musicians from Moscow
People from Moskovsky Uyezd
Soviet emigrants to the United States
American film score composers
American male film score composers
American male conductors (music)
Soviet conductors (music)
Soviet composers
Soviet male composers
20th-century American conductors (music)
20th-century American composers
Burials at Forest Lawn Memorial Park (Glendale)
20th-century American male musicians